Polygon Spur is a broad, ice-free spur lying 2 nautical miles (3.7 km) southeast of Tillite Spur at the south end of the Wisconsin Plateau, Horlick Mountains in Antarctica. Mapped by United States Geological Survey (USGS) from surveys and U.S. Navy air photos, 1960–64. The name was proposed by John H. Mercer, United States Antarctic Research Program (USARP) geologist to these mountains, 1964–65, because the surface of the spur is covered by a network of unsorted polygons.

Ridges of Marie Byrd Land